Lusignan-Petit is a commune in the Lot-et-Garonne department in south-western France.
Its inhabitants are called the Lusignanais and Lusignanaises.

See also
Communes of the Lot-et-Garonne department

References

Lusignanpetit